Juan de la Cerda, 2nd Duke of Medinaceli, Grandee of Spain, (in full), (1485 – 20 January 1544) was a Spanish nobleman.

He was the son of Don Luis de la Cerda, 1st Duke of Medinaceli by third wife Catalina Bique de Orejón. Since his parents only married In Articulo Mortis in 1501, he was considered a bastard for the first half of his life but was legitimated by the Catholic Monarchs as the eldest surviving male issue from the first Duke. He took part in the battles for the incorporation of the Kingdom of Navarre into the unified Kingdom of Spain on behalf of King Ferdinand II of Aragon. He also was a courtier under Queen Isabella I of Castile till 1504, of her daughter Queen Joanna of Castile The Mad, and later supported her son King Charles I since 1516. He was rewarded with a grandeeship in 1520.

Descendants
Juan de la Cerda married Mencía Manuel de Portugal, daughter of Dom Affonso de Portugal, 1st Count of Faro, with whom he had three children. In 1512, he married for a second time, with María de Silva (1494 – 16 August 1544), daughter of Don Juan de Silva, 3rd Count of Cifuentes with whom he had four more children.

By Mencía Manuel de Portugal:
 Isabel Mencía Manuel de la Cerda (d. 1550), who married Pedro Zapata de Ayala.
 Luis de la Cerda y Portugal
 Gastón de la Cerda y Portugal

By María de Silva:
 Juan de la Cerda y Silva
 Fernando de la Cerda y Silva (1516–1579), who married Ana de Thieulloye
 Catalina de la Cerda, who married Lorenzo Gómez de Mendoza, 4th Count of Coruña
 Luisa de la Cerda, who married Arias Pardo de Saavedra

Illegitimate:
 Francisco de la Cerda (d. 1544)
 Diego de la Cerda

Sources

1485 births
1544 deaths
Dukes of Medinaceli
Counts of Puerto de Santa María
Juan 02
Grandees of Spain